Anahita (minor planet designation: 270 Anahita) is a stony S-type Main belt asteroid. It was discovered by C. H. F. Peters on October 8, 1887, in Clinton, New York, and was named after the Avestan divinity Aredvi Sura Anahita.

In 2001, the asteroid was detected by radar from the Arecibo Observatory at a distance of 0.92 AU.

References

External links
 The Asteroid Orbital Elements Database
 Minor Planet Discovery Circumstances
 Asteroid Lightcurve Data File
 
 

Background asteroids
Anahita
Anahita
S-type asteroids (Tholen)
18871008